The Perijá metaltail (Metallura iracunda) is an Endangered species of hummingbird in the "coquettes", tribe Lesbiini of subfamily Lesbiinae. It is found in Colombia and Venezuela.

Taxonomy and systematics

The Perijá metaltail is monotypic. It is closely related to the Tyrian metaltail (M. tyrianthina) and is sympatric with one of its subspecies.

Description

It has a short, straight, black bill. The adult male's upperparts are almost black with a hint of gold; its underparts are dark bronzy green with gold highlights. It has an emerald green gorget and a slightly forked glittering ruby red tail. The adult female is also nearly black above. Its throat and upper breast are ochre-orange with olive green spots and the lower breast and belly are rich buff with green spots. Its outer tail feathers have buffish tips. Juveniles are similar to adult females.

Distribution and habitat

The Perijá metaltail is found in the Serranía del Perijá, which straddles the border between northern Colombia and northwestern Venezuela. It inhabits the varied landscapes of the different peaks within the mountain range, including open bushy terrain, karstic elfin forest, bamboo stands, grassy páramo, and areas of sandstone outcrops.

Behavior

The Perijá metaltail is believed to be sedentary. Nothing is known about its diet, foraging behavior, or breeding phenology.

Vocalization

The Perijá metaltail's vocalizations have not been described, but Xeno-canto and Cornell University's Macaulay Library have a few recordings.

Status

The IUCN originally assessed the Perijá metaltail as Near Threatened. In 2000 it changed the rating to Vulnerable and since 2004 has rated it as Endangered. Its "specialised habitat is very restricted and declining [and] habitat loss and degradation is almost certainly now impacting the known location. Smuggling, drug cultivation, and mining all contribute to the habitat destruction.

References

Perijá metaltail
Páramo fauna
Birds of the Serranía del Perijá
Perijá metaltail
Taxa named by Alexander Wetmore
Taxonomy articles created by Polbot